The genus Cordylus (Sauria: Cordylidae) includes a wide variety of species of small to medium spiny lizards from Africa, collectively called girdle-tailed lizards or girdled lizards. All are diurnal and ovoviviparous (live-bearing, without shelled eggs). Most species are rupicolous (rock-dwelling), while a few species are arboreal or live in burrows. They defend themselves with osteoderms (flat bony plates in the skin) and by quickly retreating into rock crevices or burrows. Many species live in groups, and males defend territories.

Cordylids are generally listed under CITES Appendix II. They are not necessarily threatened with extinction, but trade is controlled to prevent overexploitation. Some species of Cordylus have limited ranges and may be threatened with habitat destruction or over collecting for the pet trade.

Classification
Broadley (2006) recognized 47 species in the genus Cordylus, including eight species originally placed in the genus Pseudocordylus (P. fasciatus, P. langi, P. melanotus, P. microlepidotus, P. nebulosus, P. spinosus, P. subviridis, and P. transvaalensis) and Hemicordylus capensis. The greatest diversity of cordylids is in South Africa, with a few species found in Angola and eastern Africa as far north as Ethiopia. Other members of the Cordylidae are the genera Chamaesaura (a group of legless lizards from southern and eastern Africa) and Platysaurus. The sister group of Cordylidae is the plated lizards, family Gerrhosauridae.

In 2011, a study based on the molecular phylogeny of the family suggested several species traditionally included in Cordylus should be moved to other genera: Hemicordylus (for capensis and nebulosus), Karusasaurus (for jordani and polyzonus), Namazonurus (for campbelli, lawrenci, namaquensis, peersi and pustulatus), Ninurta (for coeruleopunctatus), Ouroborus (for cataphractus) and Smaug (for breyeri, giganteus, mossambicus, regius, vandami and warreni). This classification is supported by the Reptile Database where 21 species remain in Cordylus.

Genus Cordylus (sensu stricto):
Angolan girdled lizard, Cordylus angolensis 
Maasai girdled lizard, Cordylus beraduccii 
Cape girdled lizard, Cordylus cordylus 

Rooiberg girdled lizard, Cordylus imkeae 
Limpopo girdled lizard, Cordylus jonesii 

Machadoe's girdled lizard, Cordylus machadoi 
Coastal spiny-tailed lizard, Cordylus macropholis 
Marungu girdled lizard, Cordylus marunguensis 
McLachlan's girdled lizard, Cordylus mclachlani 
Mecula girdled lizard, Cordylus meculae 

Dwarf girdled lizard, Cordylus minor 
Kaokoveld girdled lizard, Cordylus namakuiyus 
Black girdled lizard, Cordylus niger 

Nyika girdled lizard, Cordylus nyikae 
Oelofsen's girdled lizard, Cordylus oelofseni 
N’Dolondolo girdled lizard, Cordylus phonolithos 
Rhodesian girdled lizard, Cordylus rhodesianus 
Ethiopian girdled lizard, Cordylus rivae 

East African spiny-tailed lizard, Cordylus tropidosternum 
Ukinga girdled lizard, Cordylus ukingensis 
Transvaal girdled lizard, Cordylus vittifer 

Nota bene: A binomial authority in parentheses indicates that the species was originally described in a genus other than Cordylus.

Formerly assigned in Cordylus (sensu lato):
species in the genus Hemicordylus
species in the genus Karusasaurus
species in the genus Namazonurus 
Blue-spotted girdled lizard, Ninurta coeruleopunctatus
Armadillo girdled lizard, Ouroborus cataphractus
species in the genus Pseudocordylus
species in the genus Smaug

References

Further reading
Branch, Bill (2004). Field Guide to Snakes and other Reptiles of Southern Africa. Third Revised edition, Second impression. Sanibel Island, Florida: Ralph Curtis Books Publishing. 399 pp. . (Genus Cordylus, pp. 185–186).
Broadley DG (2006). 
FitzSimons VF (1943). The Lizards of South Africa. Pretoria: Transvaal Museum Memoir.
Laurenti JN (1768). Specimen medicum, exhibens synopsin reptilium emendatam cum experimentis circa venena et antidota reptilium austriacorum. Vienna: "Joan. Thom. Nob. de Trattnern". 214 pp. + Plates I–V. (Cordylus, new genus, p. 51). (in Latin).
Reissig, Jens (2014). Girdled Lizards and their relatives: Natural History, Captive Care and Breeding. (Forward by Aaron M. Bauer). Frankfurt am Main: Chimaira. 249 pp. .
Spawls S, Howell K, Drewes R, Ashe J (2002). A Field Guide to the Reptiles of East Africa. San Diego: Academic Press. 543 pp.

External links
Tallbo
Live Birth
Sungrazers
Armadillo Lizards

 
Lizard genera
Taxa named by Josephus Nicolaus Laurenti